Jim Woodruff Dam is a hydroelectric dam on the Apalachicola River, about  south of that river's origin at the confluence of the Flint and Chattahoochee Rivers.

The dam impounds Lake Seminole on the common border of Florida and Georgia.  The dam is named in honor of James W. Woodruff, Sr., a Georgia businessman who spearheaded the development of the Apalachicola-Chattahoochee-Flint Project.

See also
Water wars in Florida

References

Dams in Florida
Dams in Georgia (U.S. state)
Buildings and structures in Decatur County, Georgia
Buildings and structures in Gadsden County, Florida
Buildings and structures in Jackson County, Florida
United States Army Corps of Engineers dams
Crossings of the Apalachicola River
Dams completed in 1957
1957 establishments in Florida
1957 establishments in Georgia (U.S. state)